Oak Lake is a community in Peterborough County of Ontario, Canada.

References

Communities in Peterborough County